Ilan Troen is an Israeli scholar. He is the Karl, Harry and Helen Stoll Professor of Israel Studies at Brandeis University.

Biography
Selwyn Ilan Troen grew up in the Boston, Massachusetts area. He is a graduate of Brandeis, with an M.A. and Ph.D. from the University of Chicago.

Academic career
When he joined the Brandeis faculty, the university announced that it was creating a chair in Israel Studies in order "to develop an accurate historical understanding of the origin and development of the State of Israel and its place in the world."

Troen believes that Israel's secular culture "has drawn from two important traditions: the prophetic tradition within Judaism and universal values generated by an enlightenment society."

Troen is a founder of the journal Israel Studies.

Published works
 Troen, Selwyn K. and Jacob Lassner. Jews and Muslims in the Arab World; Haunted by Pasts Real and Imagined. 2007 ed. Lanham and New York: Rowman and Littlefield, 2007.
 Troen, Selwyn K. "Israel Studies." Israel Studies 12. 3 issues annually (2007): 600 pages.
 Troen, Selwyn K. Imagining Zion: Dreams, Designs, and Realities in a Century of Jewish Settlement. Yale University Press, 2003.
 Troen, Selwyn K. and D.D. Moore. Divergent Jewish Cultures: America and Israel. Yale University Press, 2001.
 Troen, Selwyn K., ed. Jewish Centers and Peripheries; Europe between America and Israel  Fifty Years After World War II. Transaction: New Brunswick and London, 1999.
 Troen, Selwyn K. and Noah Lucas, ed. Israel: The First Decade of Independence. Albany: State University of New York Press, 1995.
 Troen, S. Ilan and Klaus Bade, ed. Zuwanderung und Eingliederung von Deutschen und Juden aus der fruheren Sowjetunion in Deutschland und Israel. Bonn: Bundeszentrale dur politische Bildung, 1993.
 Troen, Selwyn K. and Moshe Shemesh, ed. The Suez-Sinai Crisis 1956; Retrospective and Reappraisal. London and New York: Frank Cass and Columbia University Press, 1990.
 Troen, Selwyn K. and Benjamin Pinkus, ed. Organizing Rescue: National Jewish Solidarity in the Modern Period. London: Frank Cass, 1988.
 Troen, Selwyn K. and Glenn Holt, S. Thernstrom and T. Hareven. St. Louis. New York: Franklin Watts - New Viewpoints, 1977.
 Troen, Selwyn K. The Public and the Schools: Shaping the Saint Louis System 1838-1920. University of Missouri Press, 1975.

References

Year of birth missing (living people)
Living people
Brandeis University faculty
Brandeis University alumni
University of Chicago alumni
Writers on Zionism
Historians of Jews and Judaism